The Macau Post Daily (sometimes abbreviated to MPD) was launched on August 27, 2004, and is Macau's oldest and highest paid-circulation English-language daily newspaper.

The Macau Post Daily is a compact newspaper, i.e., a broadsheet-quality newspaper printed in a tabloid format.

History
It is owned by Macau Everbright Co. Ltd, a publishing company set up by a group of local journalists, and printed by Welfare Printing Ltd, with offices in a commercial centre on one of Macau's main avenues, Avenida do Infante D. Henrique. The newspaper, whose print edition is published on weekdays, is independent of non-media business interests and emphasizes its "equidistance" towards Macau's six gaming companies.

Content
The paper was launched to provide Macau with an independent English-language daily that caters for all its different communities interested in reading news in the world's "universal language," not just expatriates. About half of the daily's readership are local Chinese, Portuguese and Macanese residents, while the remainder are expatriates and tourists. The newspaper's reporting is focused on highlighting the importance of multicultural tolerance and understanding, as well as Macau's unique tangible and intangible cultural heritage. The newspaper adheres to the "One China" and "One Country, Two Systems" principles.

The newspaper is the world's only English-language newspaper to publish a daily general news page about the Lusophone world. It also publishes a daily news page about the Philippines. Its Page 4 is dedicated to photo-features about Macau's cultural and artistic events. Its local news, features and photos as well as opinion articles are available on its website. All its articles and photos are attributed to their sources. Its local news articles are also released on Facebook (some of them in Chinese) and linked to Twitter and LinkedIn accounts.

Circulation
In its 19th year of publication, The Macau Post Daily has a daily circulation of about 4.500, including around 700 copies distributed in Hong Kong and overseas. Subscriptions account for about 60 percent of the newspaper's circulation. In response to the COVID-19 crisis, which has affected Macau since early 2020, the daily print run has been cut by about 10 pct but its digital readership has more than doubled.

Team
The newspaper, which is headed by veteran Macau correspondent Harald Brüning, routinely offers internships to students from Macau, mainland China, Taiwan and elsewhere. Since its founding in 2004, about 80 interns have worked at the newspaper. Due to the COVID-19 pandemic, there have been fewer internships since early 2020 than in previous years.

See also
 Media of Macau

External links
 

Newspapers published in Macau
2004 establishments in Macau